The 2006 Kia Cup, southern Ontario men's provincial curling championship was held February 6–12 at the Guelph Sports Centre in Guelph, Ontario.  The winning team of Glenn Howard would represent Ontario at the 2006 Tim Hortons Brier in Regina, Saskatchewan.

Teams

Standings

Tie-breakers
Matchett 11-9 Jeffries
Matchett 7-5 Epping

Playoffs

Sources
Webarchive - 2006 Kia Cup

Ontario
Ontario Tankard
Sport in Guelph
2006 in Ontario